John Baker (January 17, 1796 – March 10, 1868) is the namesake of the towns of Baker Lake (Lac Baker) and Baker-Brook, New Brunswick, Canada, just west of Edmundston. He was a successful sawmill and gristmill businessman who became a well-known pro-American activist in New Brunswick and Maine during the 19th century and was nicknamed "the Washington of the Republic of Madawaska", which he had declared in response to the unwillingness of the Van Buren Administration in Washington to support Maine's claim to sizable areas of territory covering adjacent parts of the British colonies of Lower-Canada and New Brunswick, part of British North America. At least 22 years earlier, the War of 1812 had ended in a draw and had seriously depleted the US Treasury, demonstrating the will of Britain to engage in full warfare to guard British North America against US encroachment, including invasion of US territories and punitive raids. This had resulted in Washington adopting a policy of appeasement towards states with claims to British territories, which clashed with Maine's expansionist intentions that continued to simmer during the 1830s.

John Baker, often referred to in local lore as "Colonel" John Baker (a rank given him by a Maine militia) operated a gristmill and a sawmill on the north bank of the Saint John River, and was the leading American in the disputed territory. He was dissatisfied with the official borders, and in 1827 proclaimed an independent "Republic of Madawaska". John Baker was a native of Kennebec, Massachusetts. Kennebec was located within the area that became the state of Maine in 1820 and during his early adulthood Baker was a staunch promoter of the state's expansion toward the St.Lawrence. His confidence was such that he had established most of his mills (and himself) in an area that Washington had recognized as being under legitimate British control. The region was nonetheless claimed by Maine. Baker also had several facilities in the actual state of Maine but these were less substantial. Baker's "Republic" only included his New Brunswick properties and may have been a ploy to avoid paying taxes on either side, but the concept was popular with many of the local French speaking population who had no particular sympathies for the British or the Americans but felt a strong attachment to the area, as would Baker himself throughout his life.

Baker was instrumental in the Aroostook War, a boundary dispute that led to resolution of the imprecise 1783 international border between New Brunswick and the state of Maine. Initiated by Maine, handling of the incident was quickly taken over by the US Government and settled with the Webster-Ashburton Treaty, which left Baker's main residence and most of his mills firmly and definitively planted on British soil. Baker's name is interwoven with the boundary controversy that had led to the treaty. He had homes on both sides of the disputed territory, defied the officers of New Brunswick in many ways and was twice arrested and imprisoned in the Fredericton jail, where a statue and plaque today recognize his imprisonments and his contributions to the boundary settlement, as involuntary as they may have been. The last time that he was incarcerated was when he was indicted, tried and fined £25 for high misdemeanors against King George IV on May 8, 1828, many years prior to the settlement of the dispute.

By 1840 John Baker was in his mid-forties and his expanding business had become his main concern. His devotion to the cause of Maine was superseded by his own economic interests, and he remained in New Brunswick after the boundary settlement, grudgingly tolerating British sovereignty but never ceasing to consider himself nothing but an American. This put him at odds with the local British economic elite, and he associated mostly with like-minded French speaking and Irish settlers, providing financial support for local business ventures that would otherwise not have been possible and helping in the establishment of a mostly French speaking commercial class that rose much earlier than in other areas. He had also further endeared himself to French Canadians by supporting the establishment of a Roman Catholic mission in Baker Brook, which had never had as much as a chapel of any faith prior. Although Baker himself was nominally Protestant but not a religious man, he supported the mission as a welcome addition of community resources to "his" village. Most of his descendants married into Catholic French Canadian families, adopting both faith and language. Several hundred of his descendants still live in the "Republic" although very few bear his name. The millworks founded by Baker nearly two centuries ago is still in existence, supplying lumber to contractors in both New Brunswick and Quebec.

John Baker has the distinction of being considered a hero to two causes. "Brayons" as French Canadians of the area are colloquially called, honor him as the founder of the "Republic of Madawaska", the strongest symbol of their unique identity. The state of Maine considers him a champion of American values. Ironically neither epithet is historically accurate. The Republic was not founded to cement regional identity, and Baker's support of Maine was not strong enough to keep him there.

Baker's cultural legacy in northwestern New Brunswick was largely obscured in the century following his death. The steady rise of the Catholic Church's control over French Canadian educational and cultural institutions after 1840 had reached the area and found no reason to perpetuate the memory of a Protestant as a positive asset in local French Canadian history. Outside of Baker Brook, few heard bout him and the origins of the Republic were relegated to vague local legends. His memory would only be rekindled after the Catholic Church's  demise among French Canadians in the 1960s and 70's.

John Baker died at his country home on Chaleur Bay in 1868, shortly after New Brunswick had become part of the new sovereign country of Canada. He was buried in Baker Brook but would not be allowed to rest for all eternity. In 1895, his remains were transported to Fort Fairfield, Maine where a memorial to him as a "Maine Hero" had been established, owing to the efforts of his daughter.

References
  

1796 births
1868 deaths
Heads of state of former countries
Heads of state in North America
19th-century rulers in North America
People from Gloucester County, New Brunswick